Seyyed Saleh (also Romanized as Seyyed Şāleḩ; also known as Bait Saiyid ‘Ali, Beyt-e Seyyed ‘Alī, Sādāt Fāz̧el-e 3, Sādāt Fāz̧el-e Seh, and Seyyed ‘Alī) is a village in Seyyed Abbas Rural District, Shavur District, Shush County, Khuzestan Province, Iran. At the 2006 census, its population was 179, in 31 families.

References 

Populated places in Shush County